Bucculatrix magnella is a moth in the family Bucculatricidae. It was described in 1875 by Vactor Tousey Chambers. It is found in North America, where it has been recorded from Alabama, Illinois, Florida, Louisiana, Maine, Mississippi, Missouri and Texas.

References

Natural History Museum Lepidoptera generic names catalog

Bucculatricidae
Moths described in 1875
Moths of North America